Joshua Hall (October 22, 1768 – December 25, 1862) was an American legislator who served as the eighth governor of Maine for 34 days in 1830.

Hall, a Methodist minister in Frankfort, Maine, was elected to the Maine Senate in 1830 and was chosen as President of the Maine Senate. After Governor Enoch Lincoln died in office, he was succeeded by the then Maine Senate president Nathan Cutler.  The Maine Supreme Court, however, ruled that Cutler could not remain in office as Governor past the expiration of his Senate term on January 6, 1830. Hall as the new President of the Maine Senate was then sworn in as acting Governor, serving until the inauguration of Jonathan Hunton on February 9, 1830. Hall then retired from politics and returned to preaching.

See also
List of governors of Maine

Notes

External links
Joshua Hall entry at the National Governors Association

1768 births
1862 deaths
Methodists from Maine
Democratic Party governors of Maine
People from Lewes, Delaware
People from Frankfort, Maine
Speakers of the Maine House of Representatives
Democratic Party members of the Maine House of Representatives